The Industrial Heritage Trail links tourist attractions related to the industrial heritage in the Ruhr area in Germany. It is a part of the European Route of Industrial Heritage. The series of routes were developed between 1989 and 1999, however additions are still being made.

The route
The trail network connects museums and exhibitions that present the industrial revolution during the last 750 years in the Ruhr area. It includes 400 km of road network and about 700 km of bicycle tracks.

The attractions
There are 52 main attractions on the trail.
 Bochum Dahlhausen Railway Museum
 German Inland Waterways Museum
 Villa Hügel
 Zeche Carl

See also  
  History of the Ruhr District

References

External links 

 www.route-industriekultur.de  

German tourist routes
Ruhr
Industrial history of Germany
Tourist attractions in North Rhine-Westphalia
Heritage trails